25th NSFC Awards
January 6, 1991

Best Film: 
 Goodfellas 
The 25th National Society of Film Critics Awards, given on 6 January 1991, honored the best filmmaking of 1990.

Winners

Best Picture 
1. Goodfellas
2. The Grifters
3. Reversal of Fortune
4. Sweetie

Best Director 
1. Martin Scorsese – Goodfellas
2. Stephen Frears – The Grifters
3. Jane Campion – Sweetie

Best Actor 
1. Jeremy Irons – Reversal of Fortune
2. Danny Glover – To Sleep with Anger
3. Robert De Niro – Goodfellas and Awakenings

Best Actress 
1. Anjelica Huston – The Grifters and The Witches
2. Joanne Woodward – Mr. & Mrs. Bridge
3. Jessica Lange – Men Don't Leave
3. Debra Winger – The Sheltering Sky and Everybody Wins

Best Supporting Actor 
1. Bruce Davison – Longtime Companion
2. Joe Pesci – Goodfellas
3. Al Pacino – Dick Tracy
3. John Turturro – Miller's Crossing

Best Supporting Actress 
1. Annette Bening – The Grifters
2. Uma Thurman – Henry & June and Where the Heart Is
3. Dianne Wiest – Edward Scissorhands

Best Screenplay 
1. Charles Burnett – To Sleep with Anger
2. Tom Stoppard – The Russia House
3. Donald E. Westlake – The Grifters

Best Cinematography 
1. Peter Suschitzky – Where the Heart Is
2. Ian Baker – The Russia House
3. Philippe Rousselot – Henry & June

Best Foreign Language Film 
1. Ariel
2. Life and Nothing But (La vie et rien d'autre)
3. May Fools (Milou en mai)

Best Documentary 
1. Berkeley in the Sixties
2. For All Mankind
3. The Big Bang

Special Citation 
Renée Furst 
Jean-Luc Godard

References

External links
Past Awards

1990
National Society of Film Critics Awards
National Society of Film Critics Awards
National Society of Film Critics Awards